Washburn and Washburne are surnames.

Washburn or Washburne may also refer to:

Places

Canada
 Washburn, Ontario, a rural community

United States
 Washburn, Illinois, a village
 Washburn, Iowa, an unincorporated town and census-designated place
 Washburn, Maine, a town
 Washburn (CDP), Maine, a census-designated place and village within the town
 Washburn, Missouri, a city
 Washburn, North Dakota, a city
 Washburn, Tennessee, an unincorporated community
 Washburn, Texas, an unincorporated community
 Washburn, West Virginia, an unincorporated community
 Washburn, Wisconsin, a city
 Washburn, Bayfield County, Wisconsin, a town adjacent to the city
 Washburn, Clark County, Wisconsin, a town
 Washburn County, Wisconsin

Geographical features

Canada 
Mount Washburn (British Columbia)
Washburn Bay, Ontario
Washburn Island, Ontario
Washburn Beach, New Brunswick
Washburn Brook, New Brunswick
Washburns Island, New Brunswick
Washburn Lake (Nunavut)
Washburn Creek, Quebec

England 
River Washburn, North Yorkshire, England

United States 
 Mount Washburn, Yellowstone National Park, Wyoming
 Washburn Island, Massachusetts
 Washburn Lake, Minnesota

Schools in the United States
 Washburn University, a liberal arts university in Topeka, Kansas
 Washburn Institute of Technology, formerly Kaw Area Technical School in Topeka, Kansas
 Washburn Rural High School, Topeka, Kansas
 Washburn High School, Minneapolis, Minnesota
 Washburn School, Washburn, Tennessee
 Washburn Preparatory School (1894–1911), San Jose, California
 Carleton W. Washburne Middle School, Winnetka, Illinois

Other uses
 Washburn House (disambiguation), various places
 Washburne Historic District, Springfield, Oregon, United States
 Carl G. Washburne Memorial State Park, Oregon
 Washburn Tunnel, in the suburbs of Houston, Texas, United States
 Elihu Benjamin Washburne House, Galena, Illinois, on the National Register of Historic Places
 Washburn Field, Colorado Springs, Colorado, the stadium of Colorado College and the now-defunct Colorado Springs Blizzard soccer team
 , a United States Navy attack cargo ship
 Camp Washburn, on Washburn Island, Massachusetts, a World War II United States Army camp
 Washburn Guitars, a manufacturer of guitars

See also
 Bank of Washburn, Washburn, Wisconsin, on the National Register of Historic Places
 Washbourne (disambiguation)